Great Royal Wife, or alternatively, Chief King's Wife (Ancient Egyptian: ḥmt nswt wrt), is the title that was used to refer to the principal wife of the pharaoh of Ancient Egypt, who served many official functions.

Description
While most ancient Egyptians were monogamous, a male pharaoh would have had other, lesser wives and concubines in addition to the Great Royal Wife. This arrangement would allow the pharaoh to enter into diplomatic marriages with the daughters of allies, as was the custom of ancient kings.

In the past the order of succession in Ancient Egypt was thought to pass through the royal women. This theory, referred to as the Heiress Theory, has been rejected regarding the Eighteenth Dynasty ever since a 1980s study of its royalty. The throne likely passed to the eldest living son of those pharaohs.

The mother of the heir to the throne was not always the Great Royal Wife, but once a pharaoh was crowned, it was possible to grant the mother of the king the title of Great Royal Wife, along with other titles. Examples include Iset, the mother of Thutmose III, Tiaa, the mother of Thutmose IV and Mutemwia, the mother of Amenhotep III.

Meretseger, the chief wife of Senusret III, may be the earliest queen whose name appears with this title; she also was the first consort known to write her name in a cartouche. However, she is only attested in the New Kingdom so the title might be an anachronism. Perhaps the first holder of its title was Nubkhaes of the Second Intermediate Period.

A special place in the history of great royal wives was taken by Hatshepsut. She was Great Royal Wife to her half-brother Thutmose II. During this time Hatshepsut also became God's Wife of Amun (the highest ranking priestess in the temple of Amun in Karnak). After the death of her husband, she became regent because of the minority of her stepson, the only male heir (born to Iset), who eventually would become Thutmose III. During this time Hatshepsut was crowned as pharaoh and ruled very successfully in her own right for many years. Although other women before her had ruled Egypt, Hatshepsut was the first woman to take the title, pharaoh, as it was a new term being used for the rulers, not having been used before the eighteenth dynasty. When she became pharaoh, she designated her daughter, Neferure, as God's Wife of Amun to perform the duties of high priestess. Her daughter may have been the great royal wife of Thutmose III, but there is no clear evidence for this proposed marriage.

Elsewhere, in  Kush and other major states of ancient Africa, the rulers often structured their households in much the same way as has just been described.

Asiya, the chief consort of the Biblical Pharaoh, is regarded to have been the adoptive mother of Moses in Islam, as opposed with Pharaoh's daughter (Exodus) in the Judeo-Christian tradition.

Examples

Ancient Egypt

Middle Kingdom

Second Intermediate Period

New Kingdom

Third Intermediate Period

Late Period

See also

List of Ancient Egyptian Royal Consorts
List of consorts of the Muhammad Ali Dynasty, for the modern queens and sultanas of Egypt
God's Wife of Amun
Divine Adoratrice of Amun
Interregnum queen
Great Wife, for the modern aristocratic consorts of Africa

References

 
Ancient Egyptian titles
Egyptian royal titles
Ancient Egypt-related lists